Kaveh Rad (born June 13, 2001) is an American professional soccer player who currently plays for Hartford Athletic in the USL Championship.

Early career
Kaveh Rad was born and raised in North Carolina and played youth soccer for the Capital Area RailHawks Academy. He joined the Sporting Kansas City Academy with his brother Jahon Rad in 2016, scoring seven goals in 65 league appearances in the U.S. Soccer Development Academy from 2016 to 2019 while representing Sporting at the under-15 through under-19 levels.

Club career

Sporting Kansas City II
Rad played with USL Championship side Swope Park Rangers from their 2018 season via Sporting Kansas City's academy.

On January 24, 2020, Rad signed a fully professional contract with the newly named Sporting Kansas City II. Rad scored his first career professional goal on June 2, 2021 in a USL Championship match against FC Tulsa, receiving USL Championship Man of the Match honors for his performance. He was subsequently named in the USL Championship Team of the Week for his performance against Tulsa.

Sporting Kansas City
On April 8, 2021, Rad signed a homegrown player contract with Kansas City's first team. He made his MLS debut on May 1, 2021 during the 2021 season against Real Salt Lake at the age of 19. Rad notably received an honorable mention in just his second career MLS start, completing 92.3% of his 52 passes in a 3–1 win against the San Jose Earthquakes on May 22, 2021. He made his Leagues Cup debut in a quarterfinal match against Liga MX side Club León on August 10, 2021 at Children's Mercy Park. Rad made his U.S. Open Cup debut for the club during the 2022 season on May 10, 2022 against FC Dallas. Following the 2022 season, his contract option was declined by Kansas City.

Hartford Athletic
Rad joined Hartford Athletic of the USL Championship ahead of the 2023 season and scored a goal in his debut game on March 11, 2023 against Monterey Bay FC.

Style of play
Rad has been praised for his defensive abilities, including his clearances, pass completion, and duel winning.

Personal life
Rad is of Iranian descent. Rad's twin brother, Jahon, also played soccer for the Sporting Kansas City academy, and his brother Cyrus is also a professional soccer player.

Career statistics

References

External links 
 Sporting KC profile
 

2001 births
Living people
American soccer players
Iranian footballers
Sporting Kansas City II players
Sporting Kansas City players
Hartford Athletic players
Association football defenders
Soccer players from North Carolina
Major League Soccer players
USL Championship players
Sportspeople of Iranian descent
American people of Iranian descent
Rad family
People from Chapel Hill, North Carolina
Twin sportspeople
Homegrown Players (MLS)
MLS Next Pro players